Maurice Olivier (10 January 1887 – 15 May 1978) was a French footballer. He played in five matches for the France national football team from 1910 to 1914. He was also named in France's squad for the football tournament at the 1912 Summer Olympics, but the French side withdrew from the competition.

References

External links
 

1887 births
1978 deaths
French footballers
France international footballers
Place of birth missing
Association football wingers